Anabel Medina Garrigues and Arantxa Parra Santonja were the defending champions, but chose not to participate this year.

Ashleigh Barty and Casey Dellacqua won the title, defeating Chan Hao-ching and Chan Yung-jan in the final, 6–4, 6–2.

Seeds

Draw

Draw

References
Main Draw

Internationaux de Strasbourg - Doubles
2017 Doubles
2017 in French tennis